Alpena is the only city in and county seat of Alpena County in the U.S. state of Michigan. The population was 10,197 at the 2020 census, which makes it the third most populated city in the Northern Michigan region, after Traverse City and Cadillac.  The city is surrounded by Alpena Township, but the two are administered autonomously.  It is the core city of the Alpena micropolitan statistical area, which encompasses all of Alpena County and had a total population of 28,360 at the 2010 census.

Located at Thunder Bay along the shores of Lake Huron, the Thunder Bay National Marine Sanctuary is located in the city.  The population swells with many visitors and tourists during the summer months.  MidMichigan Health, which is a federally-designated rural regional medical referral center, is the largest employer in the city.

History

It was originally part of Anomickee County founded in 1840, which in 1843 was changed to Alpena, a pseudo-Native American word — a neologism coined by Henry Schoolcraft, meaning something like "a good partridge country."  This was part of a much larger effort to rename a great many of the Michigan counties at the time. The city of Alpena, MI was officially incorporated by Michigan State Legislature by an act of Legislature No. 249, approved March 29, 1871.

Most of the city was lost in the Great Michigan Fire of 1871. Less than one year later, on July 12, 1872, Alpena was hit by another fire, the largest in its history, which destroyed 15 acres of homes and businesses for a total amount of 65 buildings. The blaze started in a barn and lasted for two hours, killing at least four people and causing at least  in damages. Alpena was again hit by a disastrous fire on July 11, 1888. In the early 1910s a failed attempt was led by the Alpena Motor Car Company to turn the city into "Automobile City" and compete with Detroit.

The city has a number of notable buildings, including the Art deco Alpena County Courthouse, the I.O.O.F. Centennial Building, and Temple Beth El, one of the oldest synagogues in the United States.

Geography and climate
The city is on the shore of Lake Huron's Thunder Bay, with Alpena Township surrounding it on land.

Alpena has a humid continental climate (Dfb) with warm summers along with cool nights, moderated by nearby Lake Huron and cold, snowy winters with annual snowfall averaging 84 inches (210 cm).

Transportation

Air

Alpena County Regional Airport (IATA: APN, ICAO: KAPN, FAA LID: APN) is the northeast lower peninsula of Michigan's main commercial airport and handles daily Delta Connection flights to Detroit, Minneapolis/St. Paul via Detroit, and to Pellston operated by SkyWest Airlines. It is a public-use airport located in Wilson Township, Michigan six miles (10 km) west of the central business district of Alpena. The Michigan Air National Guard's Alpena Combat Readiness Training Center co-utilizes the airfield.

Rail
Alpena is situated along the Lake State Railway, formerly the Detroit and Mackinac Railway (D&M).  Earlier railroads that served Alpena were built and owned by the Alger Smith and Co. logging company: (1) the Detroit, Bay City and Alpena Railroad, which entered Alpena from the south around 1886, and (2) the Alpena and Northern Railroad.

Bus
Indian Trails provides daily intercity bus service between St. Ignace and Bay City, Michigan. This route is the Amtrak Thruway Motorcoach service for Alpena.

Major highways
 serves Alpena on its way along the Lake Huron shoreline. It has been designated the "Sunrise Side Coastal Highway", and runs along (or parallels) the Lake Huron shore. To the north, it passes Grand Lake and Long Lake, then to Rogers City, through Cheboygan, and on to Mackinaw City, where it ends at I-75 and the Mackinac Bridge.  On US 23 as it crosses Birdsong Bay just south of Alpena exists a sign which notes that it rests on the 45th parallel, indicating travelers are halfway between the equator and the North Pole. This is one of 29 places (six are in Michigan) in the U.S. where such signs are known to exist. US 23 continues south to Ossineke then further south to Oscoda and Tawas City. US 23 south joins Interstate 75 near Standish where it continues south downstate. 
 ends its  easterly route from Lake Michigan to Lake Huron traversing the northern Lower Peninsula within downtown Alpena at an intersection with US 23.

Trails
Alpena to Hillman Trail from Alpena to Hillman in Montmorency County.
North Eastern State Trail from Alpena to Cheboygan in Cheboygan County

Demographics

2010 census
As of the census of 2010, there were 10,483 people, 4,734 households, and 2,565 families residing in the city. The racial makeup of the city was 96.8% White, 0.5% African American, 0.4% Native American, 0.7% Asian, 0.1% Pacific Islander, 0.1% from other races, and 1.4% from two or more races. Hispanic or Latino of any race were 1.0% of the population.

There were 4,734 households, of which 24.8% had children under the age of 18 living with them, 38.3% were married couples living together, 12.2% had a female householder with no husband present, 3.6% had a male householder with no wife present, and 45.8% were non-families. 39.4% of all households were made up of individuals, and 17.2% had someone living alone who was 65 years of age or older. The average household size was 2.13 and the average family size was 2.84.

The median age in the city was 42.5 years. 20.7% of residents were under the age of 18; 9.4% were between the ages of 18 and 24; 22.7% were from 25 to 44; 27.9% were from 45 to 64; and 19.4% were 65 years of age or older. The gender makeup of the city was 47.7% male and 52.3% female.

2000 census
As of the census of 2000, there were 11,304 people, 4,874 households, and 2,865 families residing in the city. The racial makeup of the city was 97.66% White, 0.42% African American, 0.43% Native American, 0.48% Asian, 0.01% Pacific Islander, 0.09% from other races, and 0.91% from two or more races. Hispanic or Latino of any race were 0.59% of the population.

There were 4,874 households, out of which 26.9% had children under the age of 18 living with them, 44.1% were married couples living together, 11.5% had a female householder with no husband present, and 41.2% were non-families. 35.9% of all households were made up of individuals, and 17.9% had someone living alone who was 65 years of age or older. The average household size was 2.24 and the average family size was 2.93.

In the city, the population was spread out, with 23.0% under the age of 18, 9.2% from 18 to 24, 26.5% from 25 to 44, 21.7% from 45 to 64, and 19.6% who were 65 years of age or older. The median age was 40 years. For every 100 females, there were 88.9 males. For every 100 females age 18 and over, there were 85.4 males.

The median income for a household in the city was $30,353, and the median income for a family was $40,056. Males had a median income of $34,534 versus $21,951 for females. The per capita income for the city was $17,476. About 10.4% of families and 13.5% of the population were below the poverty line, including 16.5% of those under age 18 and 6.6% of those age 65 or over.

Education
Alpena, along with the rest of Alpena County and portions of Presque Isle County, is served by Alpena Public Schools. Alpena Public Schools was established as the first county-wide school district in the state of Michigan in 1963. The district has one high school, a junior high, an alternative/adult high school, and six elementary schools. The elementary schools are Besser, Ella White, Hinks, Lincoln, Sanborn, and Wilson Elementary Schools.

There are two private schools in Alpena. All Saints Catholic School is affiliated with the four Roman Catholic parishes in the city (St. Anne's, St. Bernard's, St. John the Baptist and St. Mary of the Immaculate Conception) and provides preschool to 8th grade education. Immanuel Lutheran School is supported by the Immanuel Lutheran Church and has preschool to 8th grade classes.

Alpena is also home to Alpena Community College. ACC is a two-year associates program that has partnerships with Spring Arbor University  and several other Michigan institutions. Within Alpena Community College is the World Center for Concrete Technology (WCCT). The WCCT draws a worldwide enrollment of students for classes in Concrete Technology, including a Master Blockmakers Degree for 5-class-accomplished students.

Competitions
 Alpena High School has hosted several FIRST Robotics Competition events.
 Alpena High School has hosted several All-Star Band events.
 Alpena High School has hosted several Solo & Ensemble events

Economy
While tourism is an important component of the area's economy, both Alpena and Rogers City have an industrial base. In particular, Alpena is home to Lafarge-Holcim cement plant and to Besser Company (maker of a concrete block making machinery), as well as a drywall board manufacturing facility owned by Decorative Panels International. Rogers City is the location of the world's largest limestone quarry, which is used in steel making in the Great Lakes and Rust Belt regions.

Alpena's primary shopping center is the Alpena Mall, the only enclosed shopping mall in the northeastern Lower Peninsula, featuring approximately 20 stores, with JCPenney and Gordon Food Service as the anchor stores. Other retailers operate in this part of town and on M-32 west of town and south on US-23.

Alpena was also home to the Alpena Thunder hockey team, until it was disbanded in 2011.

Historical markers
There are seven recognized historical markers in the city:

 Alpena City Hall
 Alpena County Courthouse
 The Daniel Carter Family, Alpena'a first settlers.
 First Congregational Church [Alpena]
 Monarch Mill
 St. Bernard Catholic Church
 World's Largest Cement Plant

Media

Print
 The Alpena News is the daily (Monday to Saturday) newspaper of record for much of northeastern lower peninsula of Michigan.
 Daily editions of the Detroit Free Press and The Detroit News are also available throughout the area.

Radio
Alpena is home to several radio stations.

AM

FM

Television
Alpena is the third smallest (208) Nielsen Designated Market Area (DMA) in the United States.

Television stations located within the Alpena DMA:
 Channel 11: WBKB-TV - (CBS, NBC on DT2, ABC on DT3, Fox/MyNetworkTV on DT4); the only locally programmed terrestrial station within the market
 Channel 6: WCML-TV - (PBS) - satellite of WCMU-TV Mount Pleasant

Cable only television:
 Cable 3: Alpena Community College educational television
 Cable 5: Alpena CW - (The CW)

Northeast Michigan is also served by selected major network affiliates from the Northern Michigan DMA, as well as CBC Television programming from CBMT-DT in Montreal. Cable television service is provided within Alpena and many outlying communities by Charter Communications.

Local libraries, museums, planetarium and landmarks
 The Alpena County Library
 The Besser Museum for Northeast Michigan and Planetarium.  The museum published The Town that Wouldn't Die: A Photographic History of Alpena, Michigan from Its Beginnings Through 1940.
 Great Lakes Maritime Heritage Center, also known as Thunder Bay National Marine Sanctuary

Notable people 

 Jesse Besser, inventor and benefactor of the Besser Museum for Northeast Michigan; lived in Alpena
 Paul Bunker, 1901 and 1902 All-American football player; College Football Hall of Famer; born in Alpena
 William Comstock, 33rd governor of Michigan; born in Alpena
 Leon Czolgosz, assassin of U.S. President William McKinley; lived in Alpena
 Bob Devaney, football coach for Nebraska Cornhuskers football and Wyoming Cowboys football; College Football Hall of Famer; lived in Alpena
 Brian Dutcher, basketball coach for San Diego State; born in Alpena
 Jim Dutcher, former basketball head coach for University of Minnesota; born in Alpena
 Robert L. Emerson, Michigan state Senator; born in Alpena
 The Frost, psychedelic rock band of the '60s and '70s originated in Alpena. Several members were born there. 
 Stanley Grenz, Christian theologian; born in Alpena
 Blaise Ilsley, pitcher for the Chicago Cubs; born in Alpena
 Lloyd R. Leavitt, Jr., United States Air Force general; born in Alpena
 Betty Mahmoody, author of Not Without My Daughter; lived in Alpena
 Harvey Marlatt, shooting guard for the Detroit Pistons; born in Alpena
 Andrew Marwede, professional disc golfer; born in Alpena
 Arthur William McLeod, member of the Wisconsin State Assembly; born in Alpena
 Joel Potrykus, filmmaker (Ape (2012 film)); born in Alpena
 Dan Rohn, infielder for the Chicago Cubs and Cleveland Indians; born in Alpena
 Paul Fitzpatrick Russell, Roman Catholic archbishop and diplomat; lived in Alpena
 Michael Bailey Smith, actor (Charmed); born in Alpena
 K. J. Stevens, novelist and short story writer; born in Alpena
 Kevin Young, first baseman for the Kansas City Royals and Pittsburgh Pirates; born in Alpena

In popular culture
 Bruce Willis and the film crew of Die Hard 2 used Alpena's airport to shoot several scenes of the film. Although the location was selected because snow was expected to be integral to the movie (and was moved from Denver's Stapleton Airport which had no snow), a dearth of precipitation in Alpena necessitated the use of artificial snow.
 In Season 5 Episode 12 of Home Improvement, Tim and Al are stuck at the Alpena airport on their way to Binford Tools' winter festival.

Parks

 Starlite Beach
 Mich-e-ke-wis Park
 McRae Park
 Thompson Park
 Washington Park
 Duck Park 
 Island Park
 Avery Park
 Rotary Island

See also

 Alpena Light
 Alpena Power Company
 Roman Catholic Diocese of Gaylord

References

Notes

Citations

Bibliography

External links

 City of Alpena's official website
 Harbor webcam, Alpena
 Alpena County Soil Survey, U.S. Dept. of Agriculture, Michigan State University Extension Service (soil, history, good general information)
 Clarke Historical Library, Central Michigan University, Bibliography on Alpena, Michigan

Cities in Alpena County, Michigan
County seats in Michigan
Populated places on Lake Huron in the United States
Micropolitan areas of Michigan
Populated places established in 1840
1840 establishments in Michigan